Harry Ewing, Baron Ewing of Kirkford,  (20 January 1931 – 9 June 2007) was a Labour politician in Scotland.  He served as a Member of Parliament (MP) for 21 years, from a by-election in 1971 until the 1992 general election, when he became a life peer.  He served as a junior minister in the Scottish Office from 1974 to 1979, responsible for devolution, and later chaired the Scottish Constitutional Convention from 1989 to 1996.

Early life
Ewing was born in Cowdenbeath, where his father, William Ewing, was a miner and Labour party activist. He was educated at Foulford primary school and Beath High School, and did National Service in the Royal Air Force from 1949 to 1951.  He worked as a fitter in a foundry, where he was active in the Amalgamated Union of Foundry Workers, and then became a postman in 1962, becoming active in the Union of Post Office Workers.

Parliamentary career
He stood for the Labour Party in the safe Conservative seat of East Fife in the 1970 general election, losing to the sitting MP Sir John Gilmour. He became Member of Parliament for Stirling and Falkirk at a by-election in September 1971, following the death of Malcolm MacPherson.  His seat was renamed Stirling, Falkirk and Grangemouth for the general election in February 1974; despite swings to the Scottish Nationalists, he retained the seat in February and in October 1974, but with a much reduced majority.  Harold Wilson appointed him as Under-Secretary of State for Scotland with responsibility for devolution and home affairs, retaining that position under Jim Callaghan as the Labour government pushed forward with a proposal for Scottish devolution. The eventual referendum in March 1979 failed to pass by a sufficient majority.  The Labour government fell at the ensuing 1979 general election, although Ewing retained his seat with a substantially increased majority.  He became a front-bench spokesman on Scottish industry in 1981.  He came third in the ballot for chair of the Parliamentary Labour Party in November 1981.  His seat was redrawn again at the 1983 general election, and he was returned for the successor seat of Falkirk East, and he became a spokesman on trade and industry matters under Neil Kinnock.  He was reelected in 1987, and stood down from his front bench position.  He was a joint chairman with David Steel of the Scottish Constitutional Convention formed in 1989 to plan for the devolution of Scotland that was planned if Labour won the 1992 general election.  Labour lost the election, and the plans were shelved.  Ewing retired from the House of Commons at the 1992 general election.

House of Lords
After his retirement, he was created a life peer taking the title Baron Ewing of Kirkford, of Cowdenbeath in the District of Dunfermline on 17 July 1992.  He became a front bench spokesman on Scottish affairs in the House of Lords, but resigned in November 1996, also resigning from his position with the Constitutional Convention.  He chaired an inquiry into housing for the disabled in 1993, and was appointed deputy lieutenant of Fife in 1995.  He was chairman of Fife Healthcare NHS Trust from 1996 to 1998, honorary president of the Girls' Brigade of Scotland, and patron of Scottish Overseas Aid. He was a life member of Cowdenbeath Football Club (the Blue Brazil).

Death
Lord Ewing, who lived in Fife, died of cancer in hospital in Dunfermline in June 2007, at the age of 76. He was survived by his wife Margaret (née Greenhill), whom he married in 1954, and their son Alan and daughter Alison.

References

Times Guide to the House of Commons, 1987

Obituary, The Guardian, 11 June 2007

External links 

1931 births
2007 deaths
Labour Party (UK) life peers
Scottish Labour MPs
UK MPs 1970–1974
UK MPs 1974
UK MPs 1974–1979
UK MPs 1979–1983
UK MPs 1983–1987
UK MPs 1987–1992
Deputy Lieutenants of Fife
Deaths from cancer in Scotland
People from Cowdenbeath
Machinists
Members of the Parliament of the United Kingdom for Stirling constituencies
Union of Communication Workers-sponsored MPs
Life peers created by Elizabeth II